Nihâl Chand (1710–1782) was an Indian painter and poet who produced some of the best known examples of Rajput painting. He was the chief painter at the court of Kishangarh during the time of the ruler Savant Singh (also known as Nagari Das).  He is attributed with a small group of paintings in a distinctive style, produced for Raja Savant Singh, and mostly depicting the king and Bani Thani as Krishna and Radha respectively.  These are "widely held to be the finest of all Rajasthani miniatures", and are unusually large for their type, reaching 19 by 14 inches (48 x 36 cm). He was a devout follower of Vallabha who had founded a Krishna-centric philosophy that surfaces repeatedly in his paintings as he signifies the deity with light blue skin. He arrived in Kishangarh between 1719 and 1726.

Gallery

References

Further reading 
 Bani Thani
 Harle, J.C., The Art and Architecture of the Indian Subcontinent, 2nd edn. 1994, Yale University Press Pelican History of Art, 
 Kishangarh Miniatures - In Quest Of Divine Love
  (see index: p. 148-152; plate 56, 70)

External links

 Raja Savant Singh and Bani Thani as Krishna and Radha Strolling in a Palace Garden

Rajput culture
1710 births
1782 deaths
People from Ajmer district
18th-century Indian painters
Miniature painting
Indian male painters
Painters from Rajasthan